Ameenpeer Dargah is a Sufi shrine located in Kadapa City in Andhra Pradesh, India.

See also 
 Kadapa district
 Andhra Muslims

References

Religious buildings and structures in Andhra Pradesh
Tourist attractions in Kadapa district
Mosques in Andhra Pradesh
Dargahs in Andhra Pradesh